Jelmstorf is a municipality in the district of Uelzen, in Lower Saxony, Germany.

References

Uelzen (district)